The Men's 200 metre freestyle S3 swimming event at the 2004 Summer Paralympics was competed on 21 September. It was won by Martin Kovar, representing .

1st round

Heat 1
21 September 2004, morning session

Heat 2
21 September 2004, morning session

Final round

21 September 2004, evening session

References

M